Shahada Assembly constituency (formerly, Shahade) is one of the 288 Vidhan Sabha constituencies of Maharashtra state in western India. This constituency is located in the Nandurbar district and it is reserved for the candidates belonging to the Scheduled tribes.

It is part of the Nandurbar Lok Sabha constituency along with another five Vidhan Sabha segments, namely Navapur, Nandurbar and Akkalkuwa in the Nandurbar district and Sakri and Shirpur in the Dhule district.

Members of Legislative Assembly

Election results

Assembly elections 2009

Assembly Elections 2014

Assembly Elections 2019

See also
 Shahada
 List of constituencies of Maharashtra Vidhan Sabha

References

Assembly constituencies of Maharashtra
Nandurbar district